Emory Scott Land (January 8, 1879 – November 27, 1971) was an officer in the United States Navy, noted for his contributions to naval architecture, particularly in submarine design.  Notable assignments included serving as Chief of the Navy's Bureau of Construction and Repair during the 1930s, and as Chairman of the U.S. Maritime Commission during World War II.

Early life and education
From Cañon City, Colorado, Land graduated from the United States Naval Academy on May 21, 1902. Following two years of sea duty, he became a naval architect specializing in submarine construction.

Career
During World War I, he served on the Board of Devices and Plans connected with Submarines in Warfare, the Board of Standardization of Submarines, and the staff of Admiral William S. Sims, who commanded all U.S. naval forces in European waters.

Land played a key role in the design of the S-class submarines from 1917 to 1919, the United States Navy's first attempt to build a submarine capable of operating with the battle fleet. Land was vice chairman of the Navy's postwar V-boat Plans Committee in 1920. He was awarded the Navy Cross for his work on submarine design and construction and for work in the war zone.

Interwar years and World War II

From October 1, 1932 until April 1, 1937, Land was Chief of the Bureau of Construction and Repair. In this position, he played a major role in submarine development leading to the highly successful fleet boats of World War II.

Land retired in 1937, but on February 18, 1938 he became Chairman of the U.S. Maritime Commission, overseeing the design and construction of the more than 4,000 Liberty ships and Victory ships that flew the U.S. flag during World War II. Land concurrently served as Administrator of the War Shipping Administration (WSA), established by Executive Order 9054 on February 7, 1942. Thus Land exercised authority over both construction and allocation of non-combatant maritime assets to Army, Navy and commerce.

Land was also instrumental in overseeing the establishment of the United States Merchant Marine Academy, located in Kings Point, New York as a commissioning source for officers entering the Merchant Marine and Naval Reserve in World War II.  Land Hall, located at the Academy, is named in his honor.

Post-war activities
On January 15, 1946, Land resigned as Chairman of the U.S. Maritime Commission. For his outstanding services he was rewarded with the Navy Distinguished Service Medal by the War Department.

Later life and death
Land served as President of the Air Transport Association of America from 1946 to 1957 and worked as a consultant for General Dynamics Corporation until his death in November 1971 at age 92. He was buried at Arlington National Cemetery, in Arlington, Virginia.

Awards and decorations

Land's personal decorations include:
 Navy Cross
 Navy Distinguished Service Medal
 Spanish Campaign Medal
 World War I Victory Medal with Submarine Clasp
 American Defense Service Medal
 American Campaign Medal
 World War II Victory Medal
 Honorary Commander of the Order of the British Empire (CBE)  1921
 Honorary Knight Commander of the Order of the British Empire (KBE) 1945
 Commander of the Legion of Honour 1947
 Grand Officer Second Class Polonia Restituta presented by Polish Government in Exile
 Philippine Legion of Honor
 Honorary Graduate of the United States Merchant Marine Academy

Legacy
 The submarine tender  is named for him.
 His uniform is on display aboard the SS American Victory.

References

External links
 

 

1879 births
1971 deaths
People from Cañon City, Colorado
American naval architects
United States Navy admirals
United States Naval Academy alumni
United States Merchant Marine Academy alumni
United States Navy personnel of World War I
United States Navy World War II admirals
Recipients of the Navy Cross (United States)
Recipients of the Navy Distinguished Service Medal
Honorary Commanders of the Order of the British Empire
Recipients of the Order of Polonia Restituta
Burials at Arlington National Cemetery
Military personnel from Colorado